Saint-Julien-aux-Bois (Limousin: Sent Julian al Bois) is a commune in the Corrèze department in central France.

Geography
The Maronne river forms the commune's southern boundary.

Population

See also
Communes of the Corrèze department

References

Communes of Corrèze